Fabrice Mvemba (born 20 December 1980) is a retired football defender from Congo DR. He last played for Dender EH in Belgium.

Career 
Mvemba began his career 1999 by Tubize, before signing a contract with Dender EH in July 2007. He retired in 2009.

External links
Profile

Living people
1980 births
Democratic Republic of the Congo footballers
Democratic Republic of the Congo international footballers
Association football defenders
F.C.V. Dender E.H. players
Expatriate footballers in Belgium
A.F.C. Tubize players
Belgian people of Democratic Republic of the Congo descent